Teams is the plural form of team.

TEAMS or teams may also refer to:

Tests of Engineering Aptitude, Mathematics, and Science, a competition sponsored by Junior Engineering Technical Society
TEAMS (cable system), a Kenyan fibre optic cable system
 TEAMS, "The Consortium for the Teaching of the Middle Ages", originally a committee of the Medieval Academy of America
Texas Educational Assessment of Minimum Skills, a standardized test used in Texas prior to 1990
Microsoft Teams, a computing platform for businesses and education

See also 
 Team (disambiguation) (including senses of TEAM)